Radu I (died 1383) was a Voivode of Wallachia (c. 1377 – c. 1383). His year of birth is unattested in any primary source. He was the son of Nicolae Alexandru and half-brother and successor to Vladislav I. He is identified by many historians as the legendary Radu Negru, a mythical voievode of the early medieval state Wallachia, founder of the state's institutions and ruler.

Beginning of reign 
Radu was the only son of Nicholas Alexander of Wallachia by his second wife, Clara Dobokai. He was co-ruler with his half-brother Vladislav I at least from 1372. He may have started his reign as sole ruler after 9 July 1374 when the last documentary mention of his brother as being alive is dated. Unfortunately, there aren't any internal documents that could attest his reign. There are a few external mentions of him, primarily documents of the Kingdom of Hungary and a contemporary Italian chronicle and also a late pisanie, an inscription on the walls of Curtea de Argeș Cathedral and an important quantity of coins (ducati, dinari and bani) which were emitted by the voievod .

Conflicts with the Kingdom of Hungary 
The relations with the Hungarian kingship during his reign remained tense, resulting in armed conflicts. The details of these fights remain unclear. An Italian chronicle "Cronaca Carrarese" tells about an expedition of the Hungarian king Louis the Great between 5 July - 14 August 1377 with the intention of subduing a one "Radano principe di Bulgaria infedele" (Italian), identified with Radu I. These tense relations which preceded the fight are confirmed by the registers of the Venetian Republic where, in the same year, a large order of full-equip armors made by the Wallachian voievod appears. These armors were to be worn by those "armadura da cavali", 10.000 at number who were defeated in battle against the Hungarian king as pointed out by the Italian chronicle.

It is hard to tell whether the troops of the Wallachian voievod were truly defeated, as from the internal documents of the Kingdom of Hungary which were published in the next period, it appears that the Hungarian king still had the intention of subduing the unfaithful voievod. Thus on 19 November of the same year, the king promised the Saxon traders of Transylvania from Brasov that if Wallachia becomes his possession he reduces the dues. On the contrary, in an order given to the landlord of Orsova in 1382 through which he was obliged to forbid any foreign trader to enter Wallachia with merchandise and to keep guard of the border "day and night" reporting everything that happened, there is no mention of a Hungarian ban of Severin and Orsova appears as border point thus suggesting that the Eastern part of Banat was annexed by the Wallachian voievod Radu I.

Maybe linked to this fact is the strange name given to the voievod in the biography of Sigismund of Luxembourg in which, speaking of Vlad Dracul, it is said that he was the son of "Merzeweydan" (Mircea) and grandson of "Pankraz dem Weisen" (Pankraz the Wise). The name Pankraz (Pancratius) is explained from the deterioration of the name Radu Ban (ban of Severin, title taken after the conquest of the territory). Nevertheless, the Wallachian voievod, in another Hungarian document which is contemporary with the events of 1377, bears the name "Godon" as well strange and unclear.

Other accomplishments 
An important event linked to the reign of Radu I is the move of the remains of Saint Filofteia from Tarnovo to Arges, event which happened app. in 1384 when the scene is painted on the walls of the Curtea de Arges Cathedral that became the guardian of the Saint and whose ctitor was the voievod with his brother and father.
His activity as ctitor of religious establishments makes him one of the most active rulers of Wallachia, building a large number of churches with Tismana, Cozia and Cotmeana being the most important. Also, during his reign the two Catholic cathedrals from Severin (a. 1380)and Arges (9 mai 1381) are built and following the tradition, a Catholic monastery in Targoviste.

Another important and controversial moment of his reign is represented by his, not well supported by evidences, ruling over the smaller of the two Bulgarian states in that moment - the Tsardom of Vidin. At the basis of this theory stands an illegible inscription on the walls of Curtea de Arges Cathedral in which, some researchers, identified the title „domn singur stăpânitor al Ungrovlahiei, al Vidinului și al oblastiei Vidinului“ ("sole ruler of Ungrovlahia, Vidin and the Oblast of Vidin"). It is true that the relations between the Wallachian rulers Vladislav I and Radu I and the Bulgarian Tsars from Tarnovo and Vidin, Shishman and Ivan Sratsimir were very tensed, the latter being themselves in conflicts for the succession of the paternal throne. Once, Vladislav I managed to annex Vidin, but he later gave it to the rightful ruler. It is possible that the same thing was done by Radu I, although the proofs supporting this theory are insufficient.

Death and tomb 
The exact date of his death, as well as his tomb, remain unknown. Archaeological digs carried out in 1920 around the voievodal necropolis (in the grounds of the Curtea de Arges Cathedral), have revealed a rich tomb dating from the end of the 14th century, presumed to be that of Radu I. His attire, jewelry and other accessories show him as a powerful feudal ruler, with all the pomp of the Wallachian court supported by evidence that is Radu I lost tomb.

References 

|-

14th-century Romanian people
Burials at Curtea de Argeş Cathedral
 
House of Basarab
Rulers of Wallachia
1383 deaths
Year of birth unknown